Southeast (SE or S.E.) is the southeastern quadrant of Washington, D.C., the capital of the United States, and is located south of East Capitol Street and east of South Capitol Street. It includes the Capitol Hill and Anacostia neighborhoods, the Navy Yard, the Joint Base Anacostia-Bolling (JBAB), the U.S. Marine Barracks, the Anacostia River waterfront, Eastern Market, the remains of several Civil War-era forts, historic St. Elizabeths Hospital, RFK Stadium, Nationals Park, and the Congressional Cemetery. It also contains a landmark known as "The Big Chair," located on Martin Luther King Jr. Avenue. The quadrant is split by the Anacostia River, with the portion that is west of the river sometimes referred to as "Near Southeast". Geographically, it is the second-smallest quadrant of the city.

Geography
Southeast includes the 32 neighborhoods of:

 Anacostia
 Barney Circle
 Barry Farm
 Bellevue
 Benning Ridge
 Buena Vista
 Capitol Hill
 Capitol View
 Civic Betterment
 Congress Heights
 Douglass
 Dupont Park
 Fairfax Village
 Fairlawn
 Fort Davis
 Fort Dupont
 Fort Stanton
 Garfield Heights
 Good Hope
 Greenway
 Hillcrest
 Knox Hill
 Marshall Heights
 Navy Yard
 Naylor Gardens
 Penn Branch
 Randle Highlands
 Shipley Terrace
 Skyland
 Twining
 Washington Highland
 Woodland

Government
Politically, Southeast includes most of Ward 8, as well as much of Ward 6 and Ward 7. Marion Barry, the former mayor of Washington, D.C., served as D.C. Council Member for Ward 8 until his death on November 23, 2014.

Culture
Nationals Park, the current ballpark for Major League Baseball's Washington Nationals, opened in Southeast in March 2008.

Transportation
Southeast Washington, D.C. is accessible via the Blue, Orange, Green and Silver Lines of the Washington Metro.

Crime
In years past, the quadrant was known by some Washington, D.C. metropolitan area residents as being plagued by a high crime rate, relative to the rest of the city.

Demographics
The population of Southeast is predominantly black. However, the African American population is concentrated southeast of the Anacostia River; the areas northwest of the Anacostia River are majority white. The portions of the quadrant southeast of the Anacostia are tree-lined and neighborly. However, shopping, dining, entertainment, and cultural options are limited, so some residents travel either downtown or to the suburbs for such services. There are several black middle class neighborhoods in Southeast, such as Hillcrest, Penn Branch, and Fort Dupont. The areas northwest of the Anacostia contain some of the wealthiest parts of the city, including the southern half of the famous and politically connected Capitol Hill neighborhood. Cultural events/activities include the annual Martin Luther King Jr. Birthday parade, the free weekly summer jazz concerts in Fort Dupont Park, the Fort Dupont ice-rink, the Anacostia Museum of the Smithsonian Institution, the Anacostia Arts Center, and THEARC tennis, arts and learning center for youth on Mississippi Avenue. The population of the southeast quadrant is roughly 226,084.

See also

SW—Southwest, Washington, D.C.
NE—Northeast, Washington, D.C.
NW—Northwest, Washington, D.C.

References

 
.